Do or Die may refer to:

Music
 Do or Die (group), hip hop group from Chicago

Albums
 Do or Die (Ant Banks album), and the title song
 Do or Die (Burn album), and the title song
 Do or Die (Dropkick Murphys album), and the title song
 Do or Die (Gospel Gangstaz album), and the title song
 Do or Die (Tim Dog album)
 Do or Die (Viking album), and the title song
 Do or Die: Diary 1982, by Nico
 Do or Die, by The BossHoss band
 Do or Die, by Eureka Machines

Songs
 "Do or Die" (30 Seconds to Mars song)
 "Do or Die" (Grace Jones song)
 "Do or Die" (Super Furry Animals song)
 "Do or Die", by 3OH!3, from the album Omens
 "Do or Die", by Amaranthe, from the album Manifest.
 "Do or Die", by The Flatliners, from the album Destroy to Create
 "Do or Die", by Forever the Sickest Kids, from the album The Weekend: Friday
 "Do or Die", by Hardline, from the album II
 "Do or Die", by The Human League, from the album Dare
 "Do or Die", by Wigwam, from the album Nuclear Nightclub

Film
 Do or Die (film), by Andy Sidaris
 Do or Die, linked from List of Bollywood films of 1944
 Do or Die, starring Polly Shannon
 Do or Die (serial), film serial

Other
 Nickname for Bedford–Stuyvesant, Brooklyn

See also
 DOD (disambiguation)
 Doe or Die, by rapper AZ
 The Charge of the Light Brigade (poem), by Alfred, Lord Tennyson, which contains the often-misquoted line "Theirs not to reason why, / Theirs but to do and die."
 A phrase used by Gandhi in his Quit India speech
 "Scots Wha Hae", by Robert Burns, 1793, contains this phrase in its English-language translation
 "Do or die", an episode in the 2021 season Survivor 41